Keith James Amos (13 January 1932 - 12 April 2017) was an English former footballer who played in the Football League for Aldershot.

External links
 
 Keith Amos

English footballers
English Football League players
1932 births
2017 deaths
Arsenal F.C. players
Aldershot F.C. players
People from Walton-on-Thames
Kidderminster Harriers F.C. players
Association football goalkeepers